Joseph James McLauchlan (5 February 1891 – 6 January 1971) was a Scottish professional footballer who played as a centre forward in the Football League for Woolwich Arsenal.

Personal life 
McLauchlan began his service in during the First World War as a private in the Football Battalion of the Middlesex Regiment. While serving on the Western Front as a private in the Suffolk Regiment in June 1916, he suffered shrapnel wounds to the leg. McLauchlan was discharged from the army in 1917.

Career statistics

References

Scottish footballers
English Football League players
Association football forwards
Linlithgow Rose F.C. players
British Army personnel of World War I
Middlesex Regiment soldiers
Bathgate F.C. players
Arsenal F.C. players
Southern Football League players
1891 births
Military personnel from Edinburgh
1971 deaths
Footballers from Edinburgh
Watford F.C. players
Scottish Football League players

Suffolk Regiment soldiers